Wandering Husbands, also known as Loves and Lies, is a 1924 American silent drama film directed by William Beaudine. It stars James Kirkwood, Lila Lee, and Margaret Livingston.

Plot
As described in a film magazine review, Diana Moreland is aware of her husband's attentions to Marilyn Foster. As he does not reform, she surprises the pair while they are dining at a roadhouse and invites Marilyn to her home. The three of them go for a boat-ride. Diana has arranged to have the boat start leaking. Threatened with death by drowning, Moreland's affection for Diana reasserts itself and he starts to swim ashore with her. Marilyn, abandoned, is saved by another boat and retires defeated. The Morelands are then reconciled.

Cast
James Kirkwood as George Moreland
Lila Lee as Diana Moreland
Margaret Livingston as Marilyn Foster
Eugene Pallette as Percy
Muriel Frances Dana as Rosemary Moreland
Turner Savage as Jim
George C. Pearce as Bates 
George B. French as the Butler

Preservation
Copies of Wandering Husbands are maintained by the UCLA Film and Television Archive and the Library of Congress.

References

External links

1924 films
1924 romantic drama films
American romantic drama films
American silent feature films
American black-and-white films
Films directed by William Beaudine
Films distributed by W. W. Hodkinson Corporation
1920s American films
Silent romantic drama films
Silent American drama films